Petri Suvanto (born November 13, 1992) is a Finnish racing driver from Seinäjoki.

After winning and placing highly in several Finnish karting championships and finishing 4th in 2008 CIK-FIA KF2 European Championships, Suvanto moved to car racing in 2010 in Formula BMW Europe for Josef Kaufmann Racing. He finished eleventh in points with a best finish of sixth at Zandvoort and Silverstone. Seeking a change of venue for 2011, Suvanto entered the American Road to Indy ladder in the U.S. F2000 National Championship. Suvanto captured four poles, five wins, and finished on the podium in all but one of the season's twelve races. He secured the championship in the first race of the final race weekend of the season over American Spencer Pigot by 47 points. By winning the championship he secured full funding to compete in the Star Mazda Championship in 2012. He signed to race with Team Pelfrey for the 2012 Star Mazda Championship season. Suvanto finished fifth in points with only a single podium finish but also only a single DNF on the season. He returned to the series, now called the Pro Mazda Championship, and Team Pelfrey for 2013, however, his season ended after four races due to lack of funding.

U.S. F2000 National Championship

Star Mazda Championship

References

External links

1992 births
Finnish racing drivers
Formula BMW Europe drivers
People from Seinäjoki
Living people
Indy Pro 2000 Championship drivers
U.S. F2000 National Championship drivers
Sportspeople from South Ostrobothnia

Josef Kaufmann Racing drivers
Wayne Taylor Racing drivers
Team Pelfrey drivers